The femoral canal is the medial (and smallest) compartment of the three compartments of the femoral sheath. It is conical in shape. The femoral canal contains lymphatic vessels, and adipose and loose connective tissue, as well as - sometimes - a deep inguinal lymph node. The function of the femoral canal is to accommodate the distension of the femoral vein when venous return from the leg is increased or temporarily restricted (e.g. during a Valsalva maneuver).

The proximal, abdominal end of the femoral canal forms the femoral ring.

The femoral canal should not be confused with the nearby adductor canal.

Anatomy
The femoral canal is bordered:
 anterosuperiorly by the inguinal ligament
 posteriorly by the pectineal ligament lying anterior to the superior pubic ramus
 Medially by the lacunar ligament
 Laterally by the femoral vein

Physiological significance
The position of the femoral canal medially to the femoral vein is of physiologic importance. The space of the canal allows for the expansion of the femoral vein when venous return from the lower limbs is increased or when increased intra-abdominal pressure (valsalva maneuver) causes a temporary stasis in the venous flow.

Clinical significance
The entrance to the femoral canal is the femoral ring, through which bowel can sometimes enter, causing a femoral hernia. Though femoral hernias are rare, their passage through the inflexible femoral ring puts them at particular risk of strangulation, giving them surgical priority.

See also
 Femoral ring

References

External links
 
 Diagram at NHS
 The Abdominal Wall from www.med.mun.ca

Lower limb anatomy